The Central District of Khorramabad County is a district (bakhsh) in Khorramabad County, Lorestan Province, Iran. At the 2006 census, its population was 417,556, in 94,201 families.  The District has one city: Khorramabad.  The District contains seven Rural Districts: Azna Rural District, Dehpir Rural District, Dehpir-e Shomali Rural District, Kakasharaf Rural District, Koregah-e Gharbi Rural District, Koregah-e Sharqi Rural District, and Robat Rural District.

References 

Districts of Lorestan Province
Khorramabad County